Bole as the official romanized name, also transliterated from Mongolian as Bortala, is a county-level city in Xinjiang, China. Bortala means "brown grasslands/steppe" in Mongolian. Bortala is the seat of Bortala Mongol Autonomous Prefecture, which borders Kazakhstan. The Northern Xinjiang Railway runs through the city along with highways to Ürümqi.

Geography
Bole has a borderline cool arid climate (Köppen BWk) just short of a cool semi-arid climate (BSk). Like all of Xinjiang, Bole features very warm to hot summers and freezing to frigid winters. Precipitation, again common to all of Xinjiang outside the mountains, is very low and chiefly falls in summer.

Notable persons
 Nur Bekri

References

External links
  Official website
  Official website

Populated places in Xinjiang
County-level divisions of Xinjiang